Alex (Supergirl) may also refer to:

 Alex Danvers, a fictional character appearing in the Arrowverse television franchise
 "Alex (Supergirl episode)", an episode of Supergirl

See also 
 Alex (disambiguation)

Supergirl (TV series) redirects